Azadeh Rojhan Gustafsson (born 1986) is an Iranian-Swedish politician who serves as a member of the Swedish parliament.

Early life and education
Rojhan Gustafsson was born in 1986 in Iran. at the age of five, she with her mother, father and brother immigrated and grew up in Sweden.

Political career
In 2006, Rojhan Gustafsson joined the Swedish Social Democratic Party for the first time and then in 2014 was elected to parliament as a member.

In addition to her committee assignments, Rojhan Gustafsson has been a member of the Swedish delegation to the Parliamentary Assembly of the Council of Europe (PACE) since 2016. In the Assembly, she serves on the Committee on the Honouring of Obligations and Commitments by Member States of the Council of Europe (since 2017); the Committee on Legal Affairs and Human Rights (since 2016); the Sub-Committee on Media and Information Society (since 2019); and the Sub-Committee on Human Rights (2016–2021).

Sources

Members of the Riksdag 2014–2018
Members of the Riksdag 2018–2022
Members of the Riksdag from the Social Democrats
1986 births
Living people
Iranian emigrants to Sweden
Swedish politicians of Iranian descent
Members of the Riksdag 2022–2026